Chersotis alpestris is a moth of the family Noctuidae.

Subspecies
Chersotis alpestris alpestris (Alps, Apennines, Pyrenees)
Chersotis alpestris ponticola (Draudt, 1936) (south-western Russia, southern Urals, Turkey, Caucasus, Armenia, Kyrgyzstan, Syria, north-western Iran)

Description
Hind wings are light brown in males, while in females they are medium or dark brown. The underside of the wings is usually yellowish brown, but in the hind wings the underside is often whitish.
Seitz states R. alpestris Bsd. (ocellina Hbn., nec. Schiff.) (Ilk). Hardly separable from the preceding, [R. ocellina Schiff] but the reniform stigma less produced and not touching orbicular; occurs in nearly the same localities as ocellina ; both species are dayfliers and are found at rest on flower heads.

Biology
Caterpillars are polyphagous on low plants.

Distribution
This species can be found in Europe (Andorra, Austria, Bulgaria, East European Russia, France, Italy, South European Russia, Spain, Switzerland and Ukraine) and eastward into Asia.

References

Bibliography
 Erstbeschreibung: BOISDUVAL (1834): Icones historique des lépidoptères d'Europe nouveaux ou peu connus 2: 1-192, pl. 47-84. Paris (Roret). 
 COWAN, C. F. (1970): Boisduval's Icones Historiques des Lépidoptères d'Europe 1832-1841. — Journal of the Society for the Bibliography of Natural History 5 (4): 291-302 
 Dufay (Claude), 1984.- Chersotis oreina n. sp., noctuelle méconnue des montagnes de l'Europe occidentale (Noctuidae, Noctuinae). Nota lepidopterologica, 7 (1) : 8-20.

External links
 Papillons de Poitou.Charentes

Noctuinae
Moths of Europe
Moths of Asia
Moths described in 1837